Fuad Khalil oghlu Guliyev (born 6 July 1941), was the 5th Prime Minister of Azerbaijan.

Early life
Guliyev was born on 6 July 1941 in Baku, Azerbaijan. He studied at a city school No. 160 from 1948 through 1958 and was admitted to the Azerbaijan State Oil Academy the same year. Guliyev graduated from the university with a degree in Petroleum engineering in 1963. From 1963 through 1965, Fuad Guliyev worked in administration of a cement factory in Krychaw, Belarus. After his return to Baku, he worked in different managerial positions at the Oil Machinery Scientific Research Institute from 1965 until 1973 and participated in designing new innovative technologies in the oil industry of Azerbaijan.
In 1973–1977, Guliyev worked in the position of a Department Manager, in 1977-82 as the Chief Engineer of the Baku Air-Conditioners Factory. In 1982, before Heydar Aliyev left his post of the First Secretary of the Azerbaijan Communist Party, he appointed Fuad Guliyev to the position of director of the factory, which Guliyev held until 1994.

Political career
After return of Heydar Aliyev to power as the President of Azerbaijan Republic, Guliyev was appointed to the post of Deputy Prime Minister of Azerbaijan. Priority tasks assigned to Guliyev were implementing reforms in the agricultural sector and preventing further inflation. In May 1995, Guliyev was appointed the Prime Minister of Azerbaijan thus replacing Suret Huseynov and held the position until July 1996. Guliyev was also elected a Deputy to the National Assembly of Azerbaijan in November 1995. During his term, he participated in the UN project for declaring Sumgait a free economic zone and signed a contract with foreign oil companies for exploration, development and production at Karabakh oil field. In 1996 Fuad Guliyev left the position of Prime minister due to his poor health. He was replaced by Artur Rasizade.

Awards
Guliyev has been awarded with various orders and medals of USSR for his innovations in the agricultural sector of economy and received recognition awards from Azerbaijani leadership for his contributions in the oil industry of the country. Guliyev holds the title of Recognized Engineer of Azerbaijan.

References

Prime Ministers of Azerbaijan
Politicians from Baku
1941 births
Living people
Members of the National Assembly (Azerbaijan)
Engineers from Baku